Scolecenchelys profundorum is an eel in the family Ophichthidae (worm/snake eels). It was described by John E. McCosker and Nikolai Vasilyevich Parin in 1995, originally under the genus Muraenichthys. It is a marine, deep water-dwelling eel which is endemic to the Nazca Ridge in the southeastern Pacific Ocean.

The species epithet "profundorum" means "of the depths" in Latin, and refers to the deep-water habitat of the eel.

References

Fish described in 1995
profundorum